The white oaks are species of trees in the genus Quercus section Quercus.

White oak, White Oak or Whiteoak may also refer to:

Tree species
 Quercus alba, the species most commonly known as the white oak
 Quercus bicolor, swamp white oak
 Quercus arizonica, Arizona white oak
 Quercus garryana, Oregon white oak or Garry oak
 Quercus lobata, California white oak or valley oak
 Quercus polymorpha, Mexican white oak or Monterrey oak
 Lagunaria patersonia, the Queensland white oak

Places in the United States
 White Oak, Georgia
 Whiteoak, Indiana
 White Oak, Kentucky
 White Oak, Maryland
 White Oak, Missouri
 White Oak, North Carolina
 White Oak, Ohio (in Hamilton County)
 White Oak, Brown County, Ohio
 White Oak, Fayette County, Ohio
 White Oak, Oklahoma
 White Oak, Pennsylvania
 White Oak, Texas
 White Oak, Virginia
 White Oak, Raleigh County, West Virginia
 White Oak, Wisconsin
 White Oaks, New Mexico

Bodies of water or wetlands
White Oak Bayou in Texas
  White Oak Lake in White Oak Lake State Park, Arkansas
White Oak Pocosin in North Carolina
White Oak Pond in New Hampshire
White Oak River in North Carolina
Whiteoak Creek Falls in North Carolina

Other uses
 White Oak (film), a 1921 silent western starring William S. Hart
 Whiteoak High School, Mowrystown, Ohio
 White Oak, Kent, part of the town of Swanley, in the Sevenoaks District of Kent, United Kingdom

See also
 White Oak Township (disambiguation)
White Oak Church in Virginia
White Oak Dance Project
White Oak Conservation, a wildlife and conservation center outside Yulee, Florida
White Oak mill